The Piper J-5 Cub Cruiser was a larger, more powerful version of the basic Piper J-3 Cub. It was designed just two years after the J-3 Cub, and differed by having a wider fuselage with the pilot sitting in the front seat and two passengers sitting in the rear seat. Equipped with a 75-hp Continental engine the plane's cruising speed was 75 mph. Though officially a three-seater, it would be more accurately described as a "two-and-a-half-seater", as two adults would find themselves quite cramped in the wider rear seat. The Cruiser sold for $1,798 when it was first designed.

Production of the three models of the J-5 (-A, -B, -C), fall into two categories that differ considerably. The obvious difference can be seen in the landing gear.  Early versions, of which 783 were built between 1940 and early 1942, have external bungees. Those built from 1944 to 1946 included design changes developed for the United States Navy HE-1 flying ambulance, and these models have internal bungees. In August 2018, 327 J-5s remained on the Federal Aviation Administration registry.

Design and development
Throughout World War II, Piper modified the basic structure of the J-5A. The J-5B had a 75 h.p. Lycoming GO-145-C2 engine. The later J-5C also built as the HE-1  (later AE-1) ambulance for the U.S. Navy with rear hinged fuselage decking, used the fully cowled 100 h.p. Lycoming Military O-235-2 or Civilian O-235-B engine with an electrical system, and redesigned landing gear.

After the war, Piper dropped the J- designation system in exchange for the PA- system, and the J-5C became the PA-12 "Super Cruiser". The Super Cruiser was more popular than the basic J-5A, with 3,759 being built.

Piper also produced a four-seat variant of the Super Cruiser with a 115-hp engine. It was designated the PA-14 Family Cruiser. It was the least successful of the three Cruiser designs in terms of aircraft sold, with 238 being built in 1948/49, and only about one hundred remain in existence.

Variants
J-5
75hp Continental A-75-8 powered variant.
J-5A
Continental A-75-9 powered variant.
J-5A-80
J-5As modified with an 80hp Continental A-80-8 engine.
J-5B
75hp Lycoming O-145-B powered variant.
J-5C
100hp Lycoming O-235-B powered variant.
J-5CA
Prototype ambulance variant produced as the HE-1 for the United States Navy.
J-5CO
Prototype observation variant, later modified as the L-4X to be a prototype for the military L-14 version.
J-5D
1946 built aircraft with a 125hp Lycoming engine.

Military designations
YL-14
Prototype liaison aircraft for the United States Army Air Force, five built.
L-14
Production variant of the YL-14, order for 845 cancelled and nine under construction completed for the civilian market.
AE-1
HE-1 redesignated in 1943 in the Ambulance category.
HE-1
Hospital variant for the United States Navy with hinged fuselage top for stretcher access, 100 built later re-designated AE-1.
UC-83
Four J-5A aircraft impressed into military service in Panama later becoming the L-4F.
L-4F
Four UC-83s re-designated and an additional 39 J-5As impressed.
L-4G
J-5B impressed into military service, 34 aircraft.

Specifications (J-5)

See also

References

Notes

Bibliography

External links

Detailed photos - Piper L-14 Army Cruiser

1930s United States civil utility aircraft
High-wing aircraft
Single-engined tractor aircraft
J-5
Aircraft first flown in 1939